Antoine Makoumbou (born 18 July 1998) is a professional footballer who plays as a midfielder for  club Cagliari. Born in France, he represents the Congo national team.

Club career
For the second half of the 2017–18 season, Makoumbou signed for Ajaccio B in the French fifth division after playing for the youth academy of French Ligue 1 side Monaco.

In 2020, Makoumbou signed for Tabor Sežana in the Slovenian top flight after playing for Mainz 05 II, the reserves of German Bundesliga club Mainz 05.

On 20 July 2021, he joined Maribor on a season-long loan. During the season, Maribor activated the option to buy and made the transfer permanent.

On 15 July 2022, Makoumbou signed a four-year contract with Italian Serie B side Cagliari for a reported transfer fee of around €2 million.

International career
Born in France, Makoumbou is of Congolese descent. He debuted for the senior Congo national team in a friendly 1–0 win over Niger on 9 June 2021.

References

External links
 
 

Living people
1998 births
Footballers from Paris
Republic of the Congo footballers
Republic of the Congo international footballers
French footballers
French sportspeople of Republic of the Congo descent
Association football midfielders
Regionalliga players
Slovenian PrvaLiga players
Serie B players
AC Ajaccio players
1. FSV Mainz 05 II players
NK Tabor Sežana players
NK Maribor players
Cagliari Calcio players
Black French sportspeople
Republic of the Congo expatriate footballers
French expatriate footballers
French expatriate sportspeople in Germany
Expatriate footballers in Germany
French expatriate sportspeople in Slovenia
Expatriate footballers in Slovenia
French expatriate sportspeople in Italy
Expatriate footballers in Italy